Dorina Szekeres (born July 30, 1992 in Zalaegerszeg) is a former Hungarian swimmer, who specialized in the backstroke and IM events. She graduated from Indiana University with a bachelor's degree in sports marketing and management. She is currently the general manager of Team Iron, founding member of the International Swimming League.

Swimming career 
Szekeres is a three-time Hungarian national champion in the 200m backstroke event.

College career 
Szekeres was member of the varsity swimming team for the Indiana Hoosiers and represented her school at three NCAA Championships. She was named team captain of the women's team at the end of her second year. In her sophomore year she became a Big Ten champion and an All-American in the 400m individual medley. Szekeres is also a Scholar All-American, an award presented to university athletes who have achieved both academic and athletic excellence.

International career 
In 2007 Szekeres qualified for her first major international competition, the European Short Course championships. She finished 15th in the 200m backstroke.

In 2008 she placed 10th at the European Junior Championships in Belgrade. She qualified for the 2010 European Championships where she placed 15th.

She competed at the 2012 European Championship finishing 17th in the 200 backstroke.

She qualified for the women's 200 m backstroke at the 2012 Summer Olympics in London, by clearing a FINA B-standard entry time of 2:14.28 from the Hungarian Long Course Nationals in Debrecen. Szekeres failed to advance into the semifinals, as she placed thirty-fifth overall in the preliminaries.

In 2013 she cleared the FINA A-standard in the 400m individual medley.

References

External links
Player Bio – Indiana Hoosiers
NBC Olympics Profile

1992 births
Living people
Hungarian female swimmers
Olympic swimmers of Hungary
Swimmers at the 2012 Summer Olympics
Female backstroke swimmers
People from Zalaegerszeg
Indiana Hoosiers women's swimmers
Sportspeople from Zala County